Chastushka is a traditional type of short Russian or Ukrainian humorous folk song with high beat frequency, that consists of one four-lined couplet, full of humor, satire or irony. The term "chastushki" was first used by Gleb Uspensky in his book about Russian folk rhymes published 1889. Usually many chastushki are sung one after another. Chastushki make use of a simple rhyming scheme to convey humorous or ironic content. The singing and recitation of such rhymes were an important part of peasant popular culture both before and after the Bolshevik Revolution of 1917.

Form

A chastushka (plural: chastushki) is a simple rhyming poem which would be characterized derisively in English as doggerel. The name originates from the Russian word "часто" ("chasto") – "frequently", or from "частить" ("chastit"), meaning  "to do something with high frequency" and probably refers to the high beat frequency of chastushki.

The basic form is a simple four-line verse making use of an ABAB, ABCB, or AABB rhyme scheme.

Usually humorous, satirical, or ironic in nature, chastushki are often put to music as well, usually with balalaika or accordion accompaniment. The rigid, short structure (and, to a lesser degree, the type of humor used) parallels the poetic genre of limericks in British culture.

Sometimes several chastushki are delivered in sequence to form a song. After each chastushka, there is a full musical refrain without lyrics to give the listeners a chance to laugh without missing the next one. Originally chastushki were a form of folk entertainment, not intended to be performed on stage. Often they are sung in turns by a group of people. Sometimes they are used as a medium for a back-and-forth mocking contest. Improvisation is highly valued during chastuska singing.

Content

Chastushki cover a very wide spectrum of topics, from lewd jokes to political satire, including such diverse themes as love songs and Communist propaganda.

Following the 1917 Russian Revolution, chastushki varied considerably in content from region to region. In some areas hit particularly hard by the grain requisitioning of the Soviet regime during the Civil War, such as Ryazan, peasant chastushki tended to be bitterly hostile. In other places, particularly those in close proximity to Moscow under Stalin's leadership, "Soviet chastushki" favorable to Stalin's Bolshevik government were sung and recited.

In the early 1920s chastushki were used by Young Communists in organized village gatherings as a form of anti-religious propaganda, subjecting the church and the rural clergy to ridicule using the traditional rural poetic form. Scholar Lynne Viola provides one such example of an anti-religious Soviet rhyme, rendered here in literal English translation:

All the pious are on a spree,
They see God is not at home.
He got drunk on homebrewed liquor,
And left to go abroad.

Given the difficult economic circumstances of the Soviet peasantry in the late 1920s and 1930s, chastushki overwhelmingly took an anti-government form, with the singing of anti-Soviet couplets a common practice at peasant festivals of the period. Following the assassination of Communist Party leader Sergei Kirov late in 1934, chastushki sprung up relating the killing to a recent decision to terminate bread rationing, including this literal translation of one example provided by scholar Sheila Fitzpatrick:

When Kirov was killed,
They allowed free trade in bread.
When Stalin is killed,
They will disband all the collective farms.

Examples 
Many folk chastushki are lewd or laden with vulgarities. The following are some relatively printable examples, with slightly loose English translations that attempt to give an approximate feeling of the chastushka's rhyme and meter, and the general meaning:

Footnotes

Further reading
 Emil Draitser, Making War, Not Love: Gender and Sexuality in Russian Humor. New York: St. Martin's Press, 2000.

External links
 Texts of ditties in Russian, in: Russian public domain library.

20th-century music genres
Russian folk songs
Russian humour
Stanzaic form
Russian poetry
Song forms